The 2008 Internationaux de Strasbourg was a women's tennis tournament played on outdoor clay courts. It was the 22nd edition of the Internationaux de Strasbourg, and was part of the Tier III Series of the 2008 WTA Tour.The tournament took place at the Centre Sportif de Hautepierre in Strasbourg, France, from 19 May until 24 May 2008. Sixth-seeded Anabel Medina Garrigues won the singles title, her third at the event, after 2005 and 2007, and earned $28,000 first-prize money.

Finals

Singles

 Anabel Medina Garrigues defeated  Katarina Srebotnik, 4–6, 7–6(7–4), 6–0
It was Anabel Medina Garrigues' 1st singles title of the year, and her 8th overall.

Doubles

 Tatiana Perebiynis /  Zi Yan defeated  Yung-jan Chan /  Chia-jung Chuang, 6–4, 6–7(3–7), 10–6

External links
 Official website
 ITF tournament edition details 
 Tournament draws

Internationaux de Strasbourg
Internationaux de Strasbourg
Internationaux de Strasbourg
Internationaux de Strasbourg
Internationaux de Strasbourg